The 1903 Baltimore mayoral election saw the election of Robert McLane.

General election
The general election was held May 5.

References

Baltimore mayoral
Mayoral elections in Baltimore
Baltimore